Esmeralda Pimentel (née Maria Esmeralda Pimentel on September 8, 1989) is an American actress and model.

She began her media career in 2009, appearing in commercials and television promotions. After participating in Nuestra Belleza México, where she ranked the top five, she entered "Centro de Educación Artística de Televisa (CEA)" to study acting and made her debut in Verano de amor in 2009.

Biography 
Maria Esmeralda Pimentel was born in The Bronx, New York on September 8, 1989 to a Dominican father and a Mexican mother, and grew up in Ciudad Guzmán, Jalisco. At nineteen she began making appearances in television commercials as a model, featuring clothing brands from Mexico.

Career

Modeling 
She participated in 2007 in Nuestra Belleza Jalisco representing Zapotlán. She was the first runner-up of the contest at the age of 18. On October 6, 2007, she participated with the winner Lupita González in Nuestra Belleza México 2007, both representing the state of Jalisco. At the finale, Pimentel was awarded the title of second runner-up, with the winner being Elisa Nájera.

Acting career on television 
After competing in Nuestra Belleza México, she decided to enter the "Centro de Educación Artística de Televisa (CEA)", to train as an actress. Her first acting offer came in 2009 when the producer Pedro Damián gave her a small role in the telenovela Verano de amor, where she played the character "Ada". Three years later, in 2012 she worked in the telenovela Abismo de pasión, an Angelli Nesma Medina production, where she shared credits with Angelique Boyer and David Zepeda. Her character was "Kenya Jasso Navarro" and her work in the telenovela earned her a Bravo Prize for the "Best New actress". That same year, the producers Roberto Gómez Fernández and Giselle González, gave her the opportunity to participate as an antagonist in Cachito de cielo, in which she starred alongside Maite Perroni, Pedro Fernández and Jorge Poza. She played the character of "Mara", a female journalist. A year later she participated in De que te quiero, te quiero, which was produced by Lucero Suárez. She was the antagonist and shared credits with Livia Brito and Juan Diego Covarrubias.

In 2014, she had her first starring role in El color de la pasión produced by Roberto Gómez Fernández. Other cast members were Erick Elías and Claudia Ramírez.
A year later, she works again with Lucero Suárez in La vecina. This is the second time that she works with Juan Diego Covarrubias and being protagonist of a telenovela. 

Few years after starring as a protagonist in Enamorándome de Ramón with José  Ron and La bella y las bestias with Osvaldo Benavides, Pimentel announced that she would depart from Televisa for a time being while quitting her contract with the television company, as she preferred to extend more creative freedom within her artistic and acting career by looking into different theater and film projects.

Filmography

Film roles

Television roles

Others awards and nominations

References

External links

1989 births
Living people
American telenovela actresses
American television actresses
American film actresses
American stage actresses
American female models
21st-century American actresses
Actresses from New York City
Mexican television actresses
Mexican people of Dominican Republic descent
American people of Dominican Republic descent
People from Ciudad Guzmán, Jalisco